Mianak (also Romanized as Mīānak) is a village in Kalej Rural District, in the Central District of Nowshahr County, Mazandaran Province, Iran. At the 2006 census, its population was 985, in 270 families.

References 

Populated places in Nowshahr County